The Confederate States of America was created on February 8, 1861, by representatives from six states that had recently declared their secession from the United States of America, starting with South Carolina on December 20, 1860. After the start of the American Civil War on April 12, 1861, between the two countries, five additional states would secede, and representatives of two others would gain admittance to the Confederacy. The country also held alliances with several Indian nations and claimed a territory in its far west. However, after its swift formation, it would only lose control over its territory over the next four years, culminating in total defeat in early 1865 and the formal dissolution of the government on May 5. The entire claimed area of the Confederate States was claimed by the United States.

Table of changes
Key to map colors

References

Border-related lists
Confederate States of America
Confederate States